Felipe Alves de Lima (born 6 May 1990) is a Brazilian footballer who plays as a forward for Treze.

References

External links

1990 births
Living people
Brazilian footballers
Association football forwards
Club Athletico Paranaense players
ABC Futebol Clube players
Santa Cruz Futebol Clube (RN) players
players
Esporte Clube São Luiz players
Alecrim Futebol Clube players
Campinense Clube players
Boa Esporte Clube players
Joinville Esporte Clube players
Tombense Futebol Clube players
Paraná Clube players
Montedio Yamagata players
Grêmio Novorizontino players
Botafogo Futebol Clube (PB) players
Operário Ferroviário Esporte Clube players
Cuiabá Esporte Clube players
Treze Futebol Clube players
J2 League players
Brazilian expatriate footballers
Brazilian expatriate sportspeople in Japan
Expatriate footballers in Japan